Hartblei is an international manufacturer of optical equipment for photography based in Kyiv and Munich. They are primarily known for producing tilt-shift lenses (Super-Rotator).  

In 2006 Hartblei started a collaboration with Carl Zeiss AG, adapting Zeiss lens designs for tilt-shift use.

Lenses
Using the unique Super-Rotator design, Hartblei tilt-shift lenses are capable of tilting in any axis, making it more flexible than other lenses such as the Canon TS-E 90mm lens.

Hartblei Super-Rotator lenses are 360° tilt-shift lenses. Some current versions of the Super-Rotator feature German-made Zeiss optics.

Hartblei optics (full frame format)
 35 mm 2.8 MC TS-PC Super-Rotator
 65 mm 3.5 MC TS-PC Super-Rotator
 80 mm 2.8 MC TS-PC Super-Rotator
 120 mm 2.8 MC TS-PC Super-Rotator
Hartblei optics (medium format)
 45 mm 3.5 MC TS-PC Super-Rotator
Hartblei "Optics by Carl Zeiss" (full frame format)
 40 mm 4 IF TS Super-Rotator
 80 mm 2,8 TS Super-Rotator
 120 mm 4 TS Macro Super-Rotator

See also 
 Perspective correction lens
 Nikon F-mount
 List of photographic equipment makers

References

External links 
 Hartblei Ukraine site
 Hartblei German site

Photography companies of Ukraine